The men's 10,000 metres long distance event at the 1932 Summer Olympics took place on July 31 at the Los Angeles Memorial Coliseum.

Results
The race was contested in a final only format, no heats.

Final

Key: OR = Olympic record; DNF = did not finish

References

Athletics at the 1932 Summer Olympics
10,000 metres at the Olympics
Men's events at the 1932 Summer Olympics